Olive salad is a salad or giardiniera made from green olives, black olives, olive oil, celery, cauliflower, carrots, sweet peppers, onions, capers, parsley, pepperoncini, oregano, garlic, vinegar, herbs and spices. It is used to make the muffaletta sandwich in and around New Orleans. Olive salad is also used as a side dish for other Sicilian cuisine and Mediterranean cuisine meals.

See also 
Tapenade
 List of salads

References

Salads
Cuisine of New Orleans
Olive dishes
Cuisine of Sicily